José de la Casa (born 1 March 1957) is a Spanish gymnast. He competed at the 1976 Summer Olympics and the 1980 Summer Olympics.

References

1957 births
Living people
Spanish male artistic gymnasts
Olympic gymnasts of Spain
Gymnasts at the 1976 Summer Olympics
Gymnasts at the 1980 Summer Olympics
Sportspeople from Jaén, Spain